Dissecting cellulitis of the scalp, also known as dissecting folliculitis, perifolliculitis capitis abscedens et suffodiens of Hoffman, perifolliculitis abscedens et suffodiens, or folliculitis abscedens et suffodiens, is an inflammatory condition of the scalp that can lead to scarring alopecia, which begins with deep inflammatory nodules, primarily over occiput, that progresses to coalescing regions of boggy scalp. Boggy tissue has a high fluid level that results in a spongy feeling. Isotretinoin  proves to be the medicine of choice for the treatment of the disease.

See also
 List of cutaneous conditions

References

External links 

Acneiform eruptions